Albert M. Barron (September 18, 1888 – March 27, 1962) was an American football player, coach of football and track, and college athletics administrator.  He served as the head coach at Michigan State Agricultural College—now Michigan State University—from 1921 to 1922, and at Temple University in 1924, compiling a career record of 7–14–2.  Barron was the athletic director at Michigan Agricultural in 1922. He also coached track at Temple and at Swarthmore College.  He served as the athletic director at Olney High School in Philadelphia from 1937 to 1957 and also coached football there.  Barron died on March 27, 1962 in Somers Point, New Jersey after a heart attack.

Head coaching record

References

External links
 

1888 births
1962 deaths
Michigan State Spartans athletic directors
Michigan State Spartans football coaches
Penn State Nittany Lions football players
Swarthmore Garnet Tide coaches
Temple Owls football coaches
Temple Owls track and field coaches
High school football coaches in Pennsylvania
Players of American football from Philadelphia